DYDA (1053 AM) ADG Radio is a radio station owned and operated by Deus Amor Est Broadcasting Inc., the broadcast arm of Ang Dios Gugma Catholic Ministries. Its studios are located at ADG Formation Center, Brgy. Hibao-an Norte, Mandurriao District, Iloilo City, and its transmitter is located at Brgy. Navais, Mandurriao District, Iloilo City.

References

External links
DYSA FB Page
Ang Dios Gugma Website

Catholic radio stations
Radio stations in Iloilo City
Radio stations established in 1965